The 2009 ITU Triathlon World Cup was a series of triathlon races organised by the International Triathlon Union (ITU) for elite-level triathletes to be held during the 2009 season. For 2009, five races were announced as part of the World Cup series. Each race was held over a distance of 1500 m swim, 40 km cycle, 10 km run (an Olympic-distance triathlon). Alongside a prize purse, points were awarded at each race contributing towards the overall ITU Triathlon World Championships point totals; which was a change in format to the World Cup series of prior years. The number of world cup races in 2009 were reduced as the ITU shifted focus to the Championship Series.

Venues, dates and prize purses

Event results

Mooloolaba

Ishigaki

Des Moines

Tiszaújváros

Huatulco

See also
ITU Triathlon World Championships

References

External links

2009
World Cup